Blowing Point is a village and one of the fourteen Districts of Anguilla, located on the southern coast. It is home to Anguilla's ferry terminal.

Transport

Ferry Terminal
There are regular ferries from St. Martin to Anguilla providing a half hour service. It is a 20-minute crossing from Marigot to Blowing Point. Ferries commence service from 7:00 AM. There are also a charter services, from Blowing Point to Princess Juliana Airport which connect to in- and outgoing international flights. In 2007, 188,176 of the 271,959 people (both visitors and residents) entered Anguilla via the ferry terminal. This way of travel is the most common method of transport between Anguilla and St. Martin or Sint Maarten. The exiting terminal will be redesigned and enlarged in 2021.

Demographics

Notable people
 Germain Hughes (born 1996), footballer

References

Bibliography

Populated places in Anguilla
France–United Kingdom border crossings
Ferry transport in British Overseas Territories